Tuck Langland is a sculptor who lives in Granger, Indiana. His monument-size bronze figures are featured in hospitals, churches, private collections, museums, sculpture gardens, and dozens of other places. He is perhaps best known for his two popular books, Practical Sculpture and From Clay to Bronze. Langland is the former Vice President of the National Sculpture Society. In addition to a sculpture career, Langland is the creator of the Tuck Langland Collection of slides of gothic architecture in England and France, housed at Princeton University.

Tuck Langland, who made the Herman B Wells statue, also created a sculpture of Ernie Pyle which sits outside of Franklin Hall at Indiana University Bloomington.

References

External links
Practical Sculpture at Amazon.com
From Clay to Bronze
National Sculpture Society
Tuck Langland Collection

20th-century American sculptors
Living people
People from Granger, Indiana
Year of birth missing (living people)